Mikita Tsirkun (born 24 March 1997) is a Belarusian sailor. He placed 22nd in the men's RS:X event at the 2016 Summer Olympics. and 18th in the men's RS:X event at the 2020 Summer Olympics.

References

External links
 
 
 

1997 births
Living people
Belarusian male sailors (sport)
Olympic sailors of Belarus
Sailors at the 2016 Summer Olympics – RS:X
Sailors at the 2020 Summer Olympics – RS:X
Belarusian windsurfers